Pusillimonas noertemannii is a Gram-negative, oxidase-positive, rod-shaped, motile bacterium of the genus Pusillimonas; the type strain (BN9T=DSM 10065T=NCIMB 14020T) was isolated from the Elbe in Germany. P. noertemannii has the ability to degrade substituted salicylates.

References

External links
Type strain of Pusillimonas noertemannii at BacDive -  the Bacterial Diversity Metadatabase

Burkholderiales
Bacteria described in 2005